The 400 metres at the 2006 Commonwealth Games as part of the athletics programme were held at the Melbourne Cricket Ground from Monday 20 March to Wednesday 22 March 2006.

The top two runners in each of the eight heats automatically qualified for the semifinals. The next eight fastest runners from across the heats also qualified. Those 24 runners competed in 3 semifinals, with the top two runners from each and next two fastest qualifying for the final.

Records

Medals

Qualification

Going into the event, the top ten Commonwealth athletes as ranked by the International Association of Athletics Federations were:

Results
All times shown are in seconds.
 Q denotes qualification by place in heat.
 q denotes qualification by overall place.
 DNS denotes did not start.
 DNF denotes did not finish.
 DQ denotes disqualification.
 NR denotes national record.
 GR denotes Games record.
 WR denotes world record.
 PB denotes personal best.
 SB denotes season best.

Heats

Semi-finals

Final

References
Results

Men's 400
2006